Petteri Lehtinen (born December 11, 1973, in Espoo, Finland) is a retired medley swimmer from Finland. Lehtinen competed for his native country at two consecutive Summer Olympics, starting in 1992 in Barcelona, Spain. His best result was a 12th place in the men's 400 m individual medley at the 1992 Summer Olympics in Barcelona.

References
Profile

1973 births
Living people
Finnish male medley swimmers
Swimmers at the 1992 Summer Olympics
Swimmers at the 1996 Summer Olympics
Olympic swimmers of Finland
Sportspeople from Espoo
Medalists at the FINA World Swimming Championships (25 m)
20th-century Finnish people
21st-century Finnish people